Joachim Loughrey (born 1947) is a former Fine Gael politician from County Donegal in Ireland. He was a senator from 1982 to 1989.

A national school teacher before entering politics, Loughrey stood unsuccessfully as a Fine Gael candidate for Dáil Éireann in the Donegal North-East constituency on five occasions: at the by-election in 1976 and at the February 1982, November 1982, 1987 and 1989 general elections.

After his February 1982 defeat, he was elected to the 16th Seanad Éireann on the Industrial and Commercial Panel. He was re-elected in the 1983 and 1987 Seanad elections, but lost his seat in the 1989 elections to the 19th Seanad, and was unsuccessful again at the 1993 Seanad elections.

References

1947 births
Living people
Fine Gael senators
Irish schoolteachers
Members of the 16th Seanad
Members of the 17th Seanad
Members of the 18th Seanad
Politicians from County Donegal